"Love, I Never Knew You Could Feel So Good" is a song by The Supremes. The song was released in the UK in March, 1977 as the third and last single from their album Mary, Scherrie & Susaye. The song is the last official single ever released by The Supremes.

On June 12, 1977, about three months after this single's release, The Supremes performed their final concert together at Theatre Royal, Drury Lane in London, England and the group eventually disbanded.

Personnel
 Lead vocals by Scherrie Payne
 Background vocals by Mary Wilson, Scherrie Payne and Susaye Greene

Charts

References

1977 singles
1976 songs
The Supremes songs
Songs written by Brian Holland
Motown singles